The Nisipoasa is a right tributary of the Olt in Romania. It flows into the Olt in Aurești.

References

Rivers of Romania
Rivers of Vâlcea County